Outstanding Handicapped Federal Employee of the Year was an annual award given by the United States Civil Service Commission beginning in 1969, to recognize exceptional job performance "in spite of severely limiting physical factors." For the first few years, ten finalists were selected by a committee, from among the nominations from federal agencies, and one winner was named. Beginning in 1973, the ten finalists were honored without a single winner chosen. 

Prominent finalists for this award included chemist Odette L. Shotwell, Army engineer Alice Chancellor, and John Fales, founder and president of the Blinded American Veterans Foundation. A 1986 recipient, LeRoy MItchell, explained to a reporter that "If there's any benefit to these awards after all, besides an ego trip for me, it would be that potential employers would realize that most office-type work is the kind of vocation anyone can handle with severe handicaps." Others expressed concern that "the use of an individual's physical condition as a basis for reward fosters separateness and inequality."

Award nominees, winners, and presenters, 1968 to 1973 
This chart is complete, based on program from the 1973 awards presentation in 1974.

Award finalists and presenters after 1973 
This chart is currently incomplete, based mostly on announcements about individual finalists.

References 

Civil awards and decorations of the United States
Disability in the United States